Bishop José Hiraís Acosta Beltrán is the current serving bishop of the Roman Catholic Diocese of Huejutla.

Early life and education 
José  was born in Pezmatlán, Hidalgo, Mexico on 22 September 1966. He completed  his ecclesiastical studies from the Regional Seminary of Our Lady of Guadalupe in Tula. He has also acquired a degree in philosophy from the Pontifical University of Mexico.

Priesthood 
José  was ordained a deacon on 25 November 1992 by Bishop Juan de Dios Caballero Reyes and a priest on 11 June 1993. He has served as parochial vicar, vice rector of the Minor Seminary, professor and formator of the Major Seminary and judge of the Ecclesiastical Court of Huejutla.

Before being appointed as a bishop he has served as prefect of studies and spiritual director of the Major Seminary of Huejutla, defender of the diocesan bond and member of the College of Consultants of the Roman Catholic Diocese of Huejutla.

Episcopate 
On 28 January 2016 Pope Francis appointed José Hiraís Acosta Beltrán as bishop of the Roman Catholic Diocese of Huejutla and consecration was done by Christophe Pierre on 14 March 2016.

References 

21st-century Roman Catholic bishops in Mexico
Living people
1966 births
Bishops appointed by Pope Francis
People from Hidalgo (state)